Havana is a town in Gadsden County, Florida, United States, and a suburb of Tallahassee. The population was 1,754 at the 2010 census. It is part of the Tallahassee Metropolitan Statistical Area.

History
Havana is of Indian origin and honours the name of Cuba's capital.

In 1902, following the completion of the of Georgia, Florida and Alabama Railroad, settlers moved a mile east to the present site of Havana, Florida. The railway town was important to the export of farming and tobacco. On December 5, 1906, Havana was incorporated into a town. The name "Havana" was proposed by James Mathewson, a schoolteacher. Shade tobacco was an important crop at that time.

On March 16, 1916, Havana was destroyed by a fire and 26 business-owned buildings were burned leaving only two remaining stores.

In recent times, much of the tobacco crop industry has declined and is known for its antiques, art galleries and specialty stores.

Geography

Havana is located in northeastern Gadsden County at  (30.624245, –84.414955). U.S. Route 27 passes through the center of town, leading southeast  to the center of Tallahassee and north  to Bainbridge, Georgia. Florida State Road 12 intersects US 27 in Havana; it leads west  to Quincy, the Gadsden County seat.

Climate

Demographics

2020 census

As of the 2020 United States census, there were 1,753 people, 935 households, and 582 families residing in the town.

2000 census
As of the census of 2000, there were 1,713 people, 700 households, and 471 families residing in the town. The racial makeup of the town was 41.86% White, 56.74% African American, 0.06% Asian, 0.82% from other races, and 0.53% from two or more races. Hispanic or Latino of any race were 1.23% of the population.

There were 700 households, out of which 26.7% had children under the age of 18 living with them, 41.1% were married couples living together, 20.6% had a female householder with no husband present, and 32.6% were non-families. 28.1% of all households were made up of individuals, and 14.9% had someone living alone who was 65 years of age or older.  The average household size was 2.43 and the average family size was 2.96.

In the town, the population was spread out, with 22.9% under the age of 18, 8.5% from 18 to 24, 25.3% from 25 to 44, 25.2% from 45 to 64, and 18.2% who were 65 years of age or older.  The median age was 40 years. For every 100 females, there were 83.2 males.  For every 100 females age 18 and over, there were 79.5 males.

The median income for a household in the town was $27,344, and the median income for a family was $38,487. Males had a median income of $25,000 versus $19,958 for females. The per capita income for the town was $18,481.  About 11.1% of families and 16.3% of the population were below the poverty line, including 18.3% of those under age 18 and 23.0% of those age 65 or over.

Education

The Gadsden County School District operates Havana Magnet School, which serves elementary and middle school grades. Gadsden County High School (formerly East Gadsden High School), outside of the city limits, is the only zoned high school in the county.

Previously the Havana area had three schools: Havana Elementary School, Havana Middle School, and Havana Northside High School. Havana Elementary began using the Accelerated School program in Spring 1995 in order to improve academic performance. In 2001 Havana Elementary, which occupied an  area, had about 100 employees and 1,000 students; most of the students were low income, and 95% of the students were from African-American families. In 2003 Havana Northside High School and James A. Shanks High School in Quincy consolidated into East Gadsden High. In 2017 the high school section of West Gadsden High School consolidated into East Gadsden High, leaving the latter as the only remaining zoned high school in the county.

Tallavanna Christian School, a private school, is in an unincorporated area near Havana.

Transportation 

The Gadsden Connector, a bus route operated by Big Bend Transit, has a stop in Havana.

References

External links

Town of Havana official website
Havana visitors website

Towns in Gadsden County, Florida
Tallahassee metropolitan area
Towns in Florida